Eriogonum viridescens is a species of wild buckwheat known by the common name twotooth buckwheat. It is endemic to California, where it grows in the Central Coast Ranges through the Transverse Ranges and into the Mojave Desert, as well as in the Central Valley. It grows in a variety of habitat types, generally on clay and sandy soils.

Description
This is a slender annual herb producing flowering stems up to about 30 centimeters tall surrounded at the bases by woolly oval leaves. The inflorescence is a wide open array of branches lined with clusters of white or pink flowers. Each flower has lobes only about a millimeter long which are wider at the tips.

External links
Jepson Manual Treatment
Photo gallery

viridescens
Endemic flora of California
Flora of the California desert regions
Natural history of the California chaparral and woodlands
Natural history of the California Coast Ranges
Natural history of the Central Valley (California)
Natural history of the Mojave Desert
Natural history of the Transverse Ranges
Flora without expected TNC conservation status